Hanneles Himmelfahrt is a 1934 German drama film directed by Thea von Harbou and starring Inge Landgut. It is set in a small mountain village and tells the story of Hannele, an unhappy girl who is beaten by her stepfather and tries to commit suicide. The film is based on the play The Assumption of Hannele by Gerhart Hauptmann. It has strong Christian themes.

An earlier adaptation of the play directed by Urban Gad was released in 1922. Harbou was best known as a screenwriter; Hanneles Himmelfahrt was her second and last film as director. It premiered in Berlin on 13 April 1934.

Cast
 Inge Landgut as Hannele
 Rudolf Klein-Rogge as Mattern, her stepfather
 Käte Haack as sister Martha
 Theodor Loos as Gottwald, teacher
 Elisabeth Wendt as Hete
 Else Ehser as Tulpe
 Ilse Fürstenberg as Wirtin
 Paul Rehkopf as Wirt
 Alfred Stratmann as Schmidt, forest worker
 Hans Mitzlaff as Hanke

References

External links
 

1934 films
Films about Christianity
German films based on plays
Films based on works by Gerhart Hauptmann
Films directed by Thea von Harbou
Films of Nazi Germany
German drama films
1930s German-language films
Films with screenplays by Thea von Harbou
Remakes of German films
Sound film remakes of silent films
1934 drama films
German black-and-white films
1930s German films